Rag Tag is a 2006 British-Nigerian drama film written and directed by Adaora Nwandu, and was Nwandu's debut feature film. The film explores the lives of two childhood friends, nicknamed "Rag" and "Tag" as they navigate life as black immigrants in Britain and come to terms with their attraction to one another. Rag Tag received its American premiere at the 2006 San Francisco International LGBT Film Festival.

Plot
Two childhood friends are reunited after many years and discover their feelings for one another have taken a new turn in this drama. Raymond (Danny Parsons), known to his friends as 'Rag', was born in London to parents who were expatriates from Jamaica, and as a child his best mate was Tagbo (Damola Adelaja), or 'Tag' for short, whose folks were émigrés from Nigeria. When Rag was sent to live with his Grandmother, he and Tag lost touch with one another, and went on to live different lives as adults.

Rag, a hustler with a great ability to break in through windows, leaves behind an ex-girlfriend and child in Birmingham to move back to London, looking to reconnect with his best friend. While Tag has graduated with honors from law school and is looking for work while dating Olivia (Tasmin Clarke), a white political activist, and still living at home. Rag finds Tag, and despite their differences they soon become fast friends again. Rag and Tag seem to understand one another and connect on a level others do not, and when Tag brings Rag along for a trip to Nigeria, their friendship moves to the next level. While Rag realizes their true feelings and attraction, Tag is still reluctant to actually go through the "last" step. However, and through it all, they will do all they can do to take care and watch each other's back.

Cast

Reception 
The film was praised for its depiction of daily life among Black British communities, and for its depiction of the struggles faced by the LGBT community in Nigeria. Writing in Variety, Dennis Harvey said that "If Rag Tag feels undercooked, it’s still a stew of intriguing ingredients, enough such to hold the attention and suggest Nwandu as a coming talent".

David McAlmont of The Guardian compared the film to his own experiences as a black gay man, writing that "The film reminds me of the genuine terror that confronts black men who are gay. A combination of African machismo, religious fervour and racial suspicion, understanding of homosexuality as a "white disease", and aggressive beliefs about the way that black men should 'reprazent' in the western world have dogged my liberty throughout both my out and closeted life".

External links

References 

2006 drama films
2006 LGBT-related films
2006 films
Black British cinema
Black British mass media
Black British films
British drama films
British LGBT-related films
English-language Nigerian films
Nigerian LGBT-related films
LGBT-related drama films
2000s English-language films
2000s British films